Pascal Rhéaume (born June 21, 1973) is a Canadian former professional ice hockey player who played in the National Hockey League. He is currently an assistant coach for the Trois-Rivières Lions. He is the younger brother of Manon Rhéaume, the first woman to appear in an NHL preseason game. His daughter, Logane joined the Montreal Carabins women's ice hockey program in the autumn of 2016.

Playing career
As a youth, he played in the 1985, 1986 and 1987 Quebec International Pee-Wee Hockey Tournaments with a minor ice hockey team from Charlesbourg, Quebec City.

Rhéaume played for the New Jersey Devils, New York Rangers, St. Louis Blues, Atlanta Thrashers, Chicago Blackhawks and Phoenix Coyotes. He won a Calder Cup with the Albany River Rats in 1995 and a Stanley Cup in 2003 with the New Jersey Devils. On August 5, 2008, Rhéaume signed a minor-league contract with the New Jersey Devils to return for a fourth stint with the organization.

Pascal's greatest career performance came in a game on January 19, 2002, while playing for the Atlanta Thrashers. During this game, he set a career high by scoring four goals and also assisted on another for a career high of five points.

Rhéaume was assistant coach of the Drummonville Voltigeurs of the Quebec Major Junior Hockey League for the 2010-11 season.

He was assistant coach of the Sherbrooke Phoenix of the Quebec Major Junior Hockey League for the 2012-13 season.

He was head coach of the Sherbrooke Cougars of the Quebec Junior AAA Hockey League for 2013-14 and 2014-15 seasons.

Rhéaume was announced as an assistant coach to the Iowa Wild of the American Hockey League, affiliate of the Minnesota Wild, on July 8, 2015.

He was announced as an assistant coach to the Sherbrooke Phoenix of the Quebec Major Junior Hockey League, on September 26, 2016.

Rhéaume was announced as the head coach of the Val d'or Foreurs of the Quebec Major Junior Hockey League on May 24, 2018. He was fired from the position on February 24, 2020; he learned of his own firing via social media.

He was announced as an assistant coach of the Trois-Rivières Lions on July 14, 2021.

Career statistics

References

External links

1973 births
Living people
Albany River Rats players
Atlanta Thrashers players
Canadian ice hockey centres
Chicago Blackhawks players
Flint Generals (IHL) players
French Quebecers
Hartford Wolf Pack players
Lowell Devils players
Manchester Monarchs (AHL) players
New Jersey Devils players
New York Rangers players
Peoria Rivermen (AHL) players
Phoenix Coyotes players
Ice hockey people from Quebec City
St. Louis Blues players
San Antonio Rampage players
Sherbrooke Faucons players
Stanley Cup champions
Trois-Rivières Draveurs players
Undrafted National Hockey League players
Vienna Capitals players
Worcester IceCats players
Canadian expatriate ice hockey players in Austria